Christianne Oliveira (previously Christianne Gadd) (born 1971) is a Brazilian actress, known for playing Donna Doyle on Night and Day from 2001 to 2003.

Career
Oliveira also appeared in the movie Chocolat with Johnny Depp in 2000, playing Chitza.

In 2003, she appeared in a video clip of the Arabian singer Amr Diab.  The clip was on song (Ana ayesh) and Oliveira was the sweetheart of Amr Diab in the clip, which was popular in Egypt and the Middle East.

Oliveira joined the cast of EastEnders in May 2006, playing Carla Mitchell. She got the part after having strong sexual chemistry with Ross Kemp, who plays her on-screen husband, Grant Mitchell, at her audition.

She joined the cast of Rodrigo Rodrigues`s Goitaca with Marlon Blue, Leandro Firmino, Luciano Szafir and Lady Francisco.

In 2020, Oliveira was cast in The Great alongside Nicholas Hoult and Elle Fanning.

Quotes
"It's a real delight to be invited to work on such a well-known show. I have been a fan of Ross' work for many years now so working with him will be a true pleasure." ~ Daily Star Sunday, 19 February 2006.
In 2009, she had a part in the Belgian series het "goddelijke monster"

Filmography 
 2000 – Chocolat – Chitza
 2003 – Night and Day – Donna Doyle
 2006 – EastEnders – Carla Mitchell
 2020 – The Great – Countess Belanova
 2021 – Goitaca – Camapua
 2021 – Pecado Vermelho – Geralda

Trivia
Christianne appeared in former pop star Kavana's music video "Crazy Chance" back in 1997.

Awards and nominations

References

External links
 

1979 births
Living people
Brazilian soap opera actresses
Brazilian expatriates in England